Founded in 1939 by Peter Yates and Frances Mullen in their Rudolf Schindler-designed Silverlake home, Monday Evening Concerts (MEC) is the world's longest-running series devoted to contemporary music. Originally envisioned as a forum for displaced European emigrés and Hollywood studio musicians, MEC has presented contemporary concerts continuously since.

Founding 
The organization launched its first season as “Evenings on the Roof,” A series of 12 concerts (6 programs, each performed twice) mixing classical and contemporary works, performed at the top floor of the home of Peter Yates and Frances Mullen at 1735 Micheltorena Street in Los Angeles. The series was priced at 50 cents per concert, or $3.00 for the complete series. Performers were drawn from world-class studio and classical musicians living in Los Angeles. 

The first program (April 23, 1939) was all-Bartók, performed for an audience of nineteen spectators. Subsequent early programs were devoted to Frédéric Chopin, Alexander Scriabin, Charles Ives, Ferruccio Busoni, Erik Satie, Arnold Schoenberg, and keyboard music from the early Baroque era. 

The initial vision for the series was to allow top musicians to program and perform according to their artistic interests without concern about audiences and financial matters; however at the same time, the attitude to the public was open and welcoming.

Artistic Directors 

Over the course of eight decades, Monday Evening Concerts has been led by five directors:

Peter Yates 

Peter Yates was a self-described passionate musical amateur. In addition to his career as a social worker in Los Angeles, Yates was a poet and music critic, contributing the music column for John Entenza's now legendary Arts & Architecture magazine. Rather than seeing himself as an Artistic Director of Evenings on the Roof, he saw himself as a 'coordinator' of the series, which existed solely 'for the pleasure of the performers.' It was mainly through his intense efforts that the MEC organization and its concerts were established, with a specific vision, and series of programs. 

Yates presented concerts in Los Angeles at his Micheltorena home, the Wilshire-Ebell Theater, and other venues. Starting with a humble audience of nineteen in 1939, some of the concerts at Wilshire-Ebell were attended by over one thousand people by the early 1950s. 

During this era, Evenings on the Roof presented portrait Concerts of J.S. Bach, Béla Bartók, Ludwig van Beethoven, Ferruccio Busoni, John Cage, Aaron Copland, Henry Cowell, Charles Ives, Ernst Krenek, Arnold Schoenberg, Franz Schubert, and Igor Stravinsky. 

Other concerts focused on numerous early Baroque (pre-Bach), Classical/Romantic, and Modernist composers. Modernist composers with works presented included Béla Bartók, Alban Berg, Ferruccio Busoni, John Cage, Elliott Carter, Carlos Chavez, Aaron Copland, Henry Cowell, Claude Debussy, Roy Harris, Lou Harrison, Paul Hindemith, Leon Kirchner, Charles Ives, Sergei Prokofiev, Sergei Rachmaninoff, Maurice Ravel, Dane Rudhyar, Erik Satie, Arnold Schoenberg, Alexander Scriabin, Dimitri Shostakovich, Gerald Strang, Igor Stravinsky, Ernst Toch, Heitor Villa-Lobos, Anton Webern, 

Distinguished performers during this era included: Sol Babitz, Richard Bühlig, John Cage, Robert Craft, Ingolf Dahl, Emil Danenberg, Wesley Kühnle, Frances Mullen, Marni Nixon, Kurt Reher, Sven Reher, Eudice Shapiro, Felix Slatkin, Leonard Stein, Josef Szigeti, and Paul Wittgenstein.

Lawrence Morton 
Starting in 1954, Evenings on the Roof transitioned to a new director, and with this new leadership, the series changed its name. Thus, on September 20, 1954 Monday Evening Concerts was born, with the music scholar and critic Lawrence Morton as Director. On this program, the writer Aldous Huxley spoke about the poet Dylan Thomas before Robert Craft led the first performance of Igor Stravinsky's In memoriam Dylan Thomas.

Morton was a seminal figure for classical/contemporary music in Southern California, best remembered for his leadership of both MEC and in the early years of the Ojai Music Festival. His wide-ranging  tastes resulted in MEC not only presenting new music, but also numerous significant performances of music from the Medieval, Renaissance and Baroque periods.  His close friendships with Igor Stravinsky and Pierre Boulez (who made his US conducting debut with MEC in 1957) shaped many of the aesthetic principles that guided Monday Evening Concerts during his directorship. 

During his tenure at MEC, Morton presented concerts at the Wilshire-Ebell Theater, Plummer Park, and starting in 1965, at the newly opened Los Angeles County Museum of Art's (LACMA) Bing Theater, where Monday Evening Concerts became the museum's first resident music program.

Portrait Concerts during this era included: Béla Bartók, Lou Harrison, Joseph Haydn, Claudio Monteverdi, Arnold Schoenberg, Karlheinz Stockhausen, and Hugo Wolf.

Other composers significantly represented in the programming of this era include: [EARLY] J.S. Bach, John Blow, Dietrich Buxtehude, William Byrd, Giovanni Gabrieli, Carlo Gesualdo, Claude Le Jeune, Josquin des Prez, Orlando Di Lasso, Claudio Monteverdi, Johannes Ockeghem, Michael Praetorious, Henry Purcell, Jean Philippe Rameau, Alessandro Scarlatti, Domenico Scarlatti, and Heinrich Schutz; [MODERN] Harrison Birtwistle, Pierre Boulez, Sylvano Bussotti, Luigi Dallapiccola, Aaron Copland, Leon Kirchner, Ernst Krenek, Rene Leibowitz, Luigi Nono, Arnold Schoenberg, Karlheinz Stockhausen, Igor Stravinsky, and Anton Webern.

Distinguished soloists, conductors and visiting artists associated with MEC during this era included: James Arkatov, Cathy Berberian, Luciano Berio, Robert Craft, Aaron Copland, Ingolf Dahl, Harold Dicterow, Alice Ehlers, Lukas Foss, Lawrence Foster, Severino Gazzelloni, Ralph Grierson, Marilyn Horne, Karl Kohn, Margaret Kohn, William Kraft, Ernst Krenek, Henri Lazarof, Natalie Limonick, Marni Nixon, Carol Plantamura, Andre Previn, Lalo Schifrin, Leo Smit, Leonard Stein, Michael Tilson Thomas (who for a while led an MEC touring ensemble), and David Tudor.

Dorrance Stalvey 

Composer Dorrance Stalvey had the longest tenure as music director of Monday Evening Concerts at the Los Angeles Museum of Art. Under Stalvey's leadership, MEC branched out into bringing guest artists and ensembles from all over the world and enhanced the series' international reach. In addition to directing Monday Evening Concerts, Stalvey became the director of expanded music programming at LACMA, resulting series with a wide variety of focuses including the Pro Musicis series (dedicated to early music), Ensembles in Residence (California E.A.R. Unit and Xtet) and Bing Concerts (typically for guest soloists and ensembles). The widening scope of these ancillary concert series led to Monday Evening Concerts narrowing its focus almost solely on contemporary music during the 1980s, 1990s and 2000s. 

Portrait Concerts during this era included: Béla Bartók, Earle Brown, Sylvano Bussotti, John Cage, Elliott Carter, Aaron Copland, Ernst Krenek, Steve Reich, Frederic Rzewski, Arnold Schoenberg, Igor Stravinsky, and Anton Webern. 

Other composers represented: [EARLY] Giovanni Pierluigi da Palestrina, Claudio Monteverdi, Carlo Gesualdo, Cipriano de Rore, Joseph Bodin de Boismortier, Gaspar Sanz, Girolamo Frescobaldi, Marin Marais, Tobias Hume, Sigismondo d'India, Jacob van Eyck, Luzzasco Luzzaschi, Guillaume Dufay, Jean Baptiste Loeillet, Heinrich Schutz; [MODERN] George Antheil, Luciano Berio, Harrison Birtwistle, Pierre Boulez, Anthony Braxton, Harold Budd, Sylvano Bussotti, Elliott Carter, Brian Ferneyhough, Lou Harrison, Hans Werner Henze, György Kurtág, Joan La Barbara, Helmut Lachenmann, David Lang, George Lewis, György Ligeti, Conlon Nancarrow, Olga Neuwirth, Steve Reich, Terry Riley, Giacinto Scelsi, Salvatore Sciarrino, Stefano Scodanibbio, Wadada Leo Smith, Kaija Saariaho, Karlheinz Stockhausen, Igor Stravinsky, Morton Subotnick, and Iannis Xenakis. 

Distinguished soloists, conductors and visiting artists associated with MEC during this era included: Magnus Andersson, Earle Brown, Sylvano Bussotti, Marino Formenti, Lukas Foss, Claude Helffer, Nicholas Isherwood, Joel Krosnick, Reinbert de Leeuw, Alvin Lucier, Kent Nagano, Susan Narucki, Ursula Oppens, Terry Riley, Frederick Rzewski, Gerhard Samuel, Steven Schick, Stefano Scodanibbio, Richard Stoltzman, Barbara Sukowa, Aki Takahashi, Michael Tilson Thomas, William Winant, Charles Wuorinen, and Frank Zappa. 

Visiting and resident ensembles included: Aeolian Chamber Players, Asko/Schoenberg Ensemble, Arditti Quartet, California E.A.R. Unit, Da Capo Chamber Players, Flux Quartet, Kronos Quartet, Les Percussions de Strasbourg, New York New Music Ensemble, Nexus Percussion, Red Fish Blue Fish, San Francisco Contemporary Chamber Players, Speculum Musicae, Steve Reich and Musicians, and Tashi.

Justin Urcis 

In 2005, after four decades in residence, MEC lost its long-time director Dorrance Stalvey and its contracts with LACMA. Finding itself suddenly director-less and venue-less, MEC reorganized its operations, re-emerging as an independent organization led by arts administrator and amateur pianist Justin Urcis, and a board of fifteen distinguished leaders in the musical landscape of Los Angeles, including then Los Angeles Philharmonic executive director Ernest Fleischmann. After an opening sold-out concert at REDCAT, the principal home base for concerts became Herbert Zipper Concert Hall at the Colburn School. Seasons were reduced to between four and six programs per season from twelve.

Portrait Concerts during this era included: Hans Abrahamsen, Frank Denyer, Gérard Grisey, Georg Friedrich Haas, Mauricio Kagel, Helmut Lachenmann, Klaus Lang, Ramon Lazkano, Chris Newman, Lewis Nielson, Charlemagne Palestine, Rolf Riehm, and Galina Ustvolskaya. 

Other composers significantly represented included J.S. Bach, Pierluigi Billone, Harrison Birtwistle, Rick Burkhart, Frank Denyer, Morton Feldman, György Kurtág, Jo Kondo, Jose Maceda, Salvatore Sciarrino, Heinrich Schutz, Simon Steen-Andersen, Alexandre Rabinovitch-Barakovsky, Fausto Romitelli, Horatiu Radulescu, Wolfgang von Schweinitz, and Jakob Ullmann. 

Distinguished soloists, conductors and visiting artists associated with MEC during this era included: 
Jay Campbell, Mario Caroli, Luciano Chessa, Donald Crockett, Justin Dehart, Christian Dierstein, Marino Formenti, Michel Galante, Jonathan Hepfer, Eric Huebner, Nicholas Isherwood, Aleck Karis, Ross Karre, Kuniko Kato, Amy Knoles, William Kraft, Helmut Lachenmann, Klaus Lang, Alexander Lonquich, Alexei Lubimov, Mark Menzies, Rei Nakamura, Susan Narucki, Movses Pogossian, Vicki Ray, Vincent Royer, Steven Schick, Alice Teyssier, and Richard Valitutto. <

Visiting ensembles during this period included: Arditti Quartet, Argento Ensemble, Asamisimasa, Calder Quartet, Formalist Quartet, JACK Quartet, Ensemble Recherche, and Red Fish Blue Fish.

Jonathan Hepfer 

In 2015, Justin Urcis stepped down as artistic director of MEC, and leadership was transferred to the conductor, percussionist and curator Jonathan Hepfer. Under Hepfer, MEC's programming and production have evolved to a greater variety and scope, including an emphasis on unconventional curatorial combinations. To develop and present concerts, he has assembled a large team of collaborators in music, visual arts, literature, theory, business, management, and production. 

In addition to MEC's traditional home of Zipper Concert Hall at the Colburn School, during this era, MEC has presented concerts at Hauser & Wirth, the Getty Museum, LAXART Gallery, BP Hall at Walt Disney Concert Hall, and the Wende Museum. 

Portrait concerts have included: Georges Aperghis, Julius Eastman, Morton Feldman, Philip Glass, Butch Morris, Éliane Radigue, and Steve Reich. 

Composer pairings have included: 
 Arnold Schoenberg and Steven Takasugi, 
 Gérard Grisey, Carlo Gesualdo, and Salvatore Sciarrino 
 Michael Pisaro and Guillaume de Machaut, 
 Pierluigi Billone and Hildegard von Bingen 
 Salvatore Sciarrino, Isabel Mundry and Guillaume Dufay
 Meredith Monk and Julius Eastman 
 Steve Reich, Léonin and Pérotin
 Sarah Hennies and Julius Eastman
 Chaya Czernowin and Robert Schumann
 Pierre Boulez, Claude Debussy, and Toru Takemitsu 
 Iannis Xenakis and Bernard Parmegiani
 Trevor Bača and Caroline Shaw
 Yves Klein and John Cage
 Arvo Pärt and John Sheppard

Distinguished soloists, conductors and visiting artists associated with MEC during this era included: 
Tony Arnold, James Baker, Séverine Ballon, Gloria Cheng, Dustin Donahue, Tim Feeney, Marino Formenti, Sarah Hennies, Jonathan Hepfer, Nicolas Hodges, Sidney Hopson, Nathalie Joachim, Laurel Irene, Josef Kubera, Josh Lee, Alex Lipowski, Alexei Lubimov, Varty Manouelian, Andrew McIntosh, Ursula Oppens, Movses Pogossian, Vicki Ray, Michael Pisaro, Davóne Tines, Carol Robinson, Greg Stuart, Adam Tendler, Alice Teyssier, Richard Valitutto, Ashley Walters, Seth Parker Woods, and Nate Wooley. 

Visiting ensembles during this period have included: ECHOI Ensemble, Formalist Quartet,
JACK Quartet, Talea Ensemble, Ensemble Vocatrix, Yarn/Wire, 

Non-musical collaborators during this period have included: Isabelle Albuquerque, Eva Doležalová, Paul Griffiths, David Hammons, Paul Holdengräber, Julian Sands, Mahfuz Sultan, Hamza Walker.

MEC Organization 

Monday Evening Concerts is a 501c3 Not-For-Profit. Governance and management is conducted by a Board of Directors and President (Isaac Malitz); an Executive Committee; and staff for accounting, legal, and development. 

Artistic matters are managed by the Artistic Director (Jonathan Hepfer). 

Resources include: Artistic Advisory Board; Production Team; Writer (Trevor Bača); Photographer (Anneliese Varaldiev); Artist In Residence (Davóne Tines); In-house Ensemble-In-Residence (ECHOI). Also a wide range of informal resources who participate in programs and events ad hoc. 

MEC’s work is focused on concerts/events. However an emerging activity has been scholarly, focused on the documentation of the long historical activities of MEC.

References

External Links 

https://www.mondayeveningconcerts.org

Concerts
Concerts in the United States
Concerts by artist